INSV Tarini is the second sailboat of the Indian Navy. She was constructed at Aquarius Shipyard located in Goa. After undergoing extensive sea trials, she was commissioned to Indian Navy service on 18 February 2017.

Design and description 
INSV Tarini is a cruising sloop built at the Aquarius Shipyard in Divar, Goa. The vessel was handed over to the Indian Navy on 18 February 2017, christened INSV Tarini, after the Tara Tarini temple. Tarini's hull is built of wood-core and fibreglass sandwich. The boat has six sails, including mainsail, genoa, stay, downwind and storm sail. She is capable of sailing in extreme conditions. The boat measures 56 feet in length. The mast, custom built by Southern Spars, is about 25 meters tall. 
 
Tarini was built to a stock design by Van de Stadt called Tonga 56. The keel for Tarini was laid by Defence Minister Manohar Parrikar at the Aquarius Shipyard on 27 March 2016. The boat was delivered to the navy prior to the scheduled date. She successfully completed her sea trials on 30 January 2017. Several improvements were incorporated in this ship based on experience gained from operating INSV Mhadei. She is fitted with advanced features such as satellite communications, Raymarine navigation suite and a Monitor windvane equipped for emergency steering. 

Tarini is similar to her predecessor, the INSV Mhadei, which has travelled over 115,000 nautical miles during her eight years of service.

Service history 

Promptly upon completion of the commissioning ceremony at INS Mandovi Boat Pool, the crew demonstrated the handling capabilities of the boat by sailing her out of the harbour. An all-woman crew led by Lieutenant Commander Vartika Joshi undertook an expedition to circumnavigate the globe, sailing off on 10 September 2017 and completing the voyage on 21 May 2018.

Navika Sagar Parikrama 

Navika Sagar Parikrama is the name of expedition for circumnavigation the globe on INSV Tarini by Indian Navy's Women Naval Officers. The six-member all-woman team, led by Lieutenant Commander Vartika Goshi and composed of Lt Commander Vartika Goshi, Lt Commander Pratibha Jamwal, Lt Commander Swati P, Lieutenant Aishwarya Boddapati, Lieutenant S Vijaya Devi and Lieutenant Payal Gupta, circumnavigated and manage the whole operation in this first ever global journey. The voyage which lasted for 254 days, covered 21600 miles, had 5 port calls in Fremantle Australia; Lyttelton, New Zealand; Port Stanley, Falklands, Cape Town, South Africa and finally at Mauritius before returning home to Goa. All six members of the crew were trained for about one year under Captain Dilip Donde, who is also the first Indian to successfully carry out solo-circumnavigation of the globe between 2009 and 2010. 

The women had to face strong winds of more than 60 knots and very high waves of up to 7 metres. In addition to successfully circumnavigating the globe the crew also collected and updated meteorological, ocean and wave data on a regular basis for accurate weather forecasts by the National Centre For Medium Range Weather Forecasting (NCMRWF) and the Indian Meteorological Department and reported marine pollution on the high seas.

Notes

References

External links 
 

2017 ships
Individual sailing vessels
Ships built in India
Ships of the Indian Navy
Sloops of India
Sailboat type designs by E. G. van de Stadt